Dettlef Günther (sometimes shown as Detlef Günther, born 27 August 1954 in Erlabrunn, Saxony) is an East German former luger who competed from the mid-1970s to the early 1980s. He won the gold medal in the men's singles event at the 1976 Winter Olympics in Innsbruck. At the 1980 Winter Olympics in Lake Placid, New York, Günther was favored to repeat after leading the first two runs, but crashed at the end of the third run causing him to lose three seconds and settling for fourth in the standings.

Günther also won the gold medal in the men's singles event at the 1979 FIL World Luge Championships in Königssee, West Germany. He also won two medals in the men's singles event at the FIL European Luge Championships with a gold in 1975 and a silver in 1979.

References

 
Wallenchinsky, David. (1984). "Men's Singles Luge". In The Complete Book of the Olympics: 1896–1980. New York: Penguin Books. p. 576.

1954 births
Living people
German male lugers
Lugers at the 1976 Winter Olympics
Lugers at the 1980 Winter Olympics
Olympic gold medalists for East Germany
Olympic lugers of East Germany
Olympic medalists in luge
Medalists at the 1976 Winter Olympics
People of the Stasi
People from Erzgebirgskreis
Sportspeople from Saxony